Rafael Pacheco Hernández (born 1954 in Madrid) is a Spanish astronomer of Catalan origin and a prolific discoverer of asteroids, credited by the Minor Planet Center with the discovery of numerous minor planets mostly in collaboration with astronomer Álvaro López-García.

The asteroid 25001 Pacheco was named in his honor.

List of discovered minor planets 

Rafael Pacheco discovered 57 minor planets.

References 
 
 Brief biography of Rafael Pacheco 

1954 births
Discoverers of asteroids

Living people
20th-century Spanish astronomers